Shivanandan Prasad Mandal was a freedom fighter and politician. He was the first law minister of Bihar. He played a role in the Bang Bhang movement, the non-cooperation movement and the salt movement.

Sivanandan Prasad Mandal was born in a Yadav family of Ranipatti village in the erstwhile Saharsa district (now in Madhepura).

See also
Kamleshwari Prasad Yadav
B.P. Mandal

References

Indian National Congress politicians
Bihari Ahirs
People from Bihar
People from Saharsa district
Bihar MLAs 1952–1957
Bihar MLAs 1957–1962
1891 births
Year of death missing
Indian National Congress politicians from Bihar